Bryncoch South is an electoral ward of Neath Port Talbot county borough, Wales forming part of the parish of Blaenhonddan. The ward elects two county councillors to Neath Port Talbot County Borough Council.

Bryncoch South covers some or all of the following areas: Bryncoch, Caewern and Rhydding in the parliamentary constituency of Neath.  Bryncoch South is an almost completely developed ward.  It is bounded by the wards of Bryncoch North to the north; Cadoxton to the east; Neath North to the southeast; and Dyffryn to the southwest.

In the 2012 local council elections, the electorate turnout was 37.25%.  The results were:

In the 2017 local council elections, the results were:

Councillor Dudley has represented the seat since 2004. While performing her duties as Mayor of Neath Port Talbot in August 2017 she was taken ill and died. A by-election was held on 23 November 2017 and the results were:

References

Electoral wards of Neath Port Talbot